Mayorga is a district of the Liberia canton, in the Guanacaste province of Costa Rica.

History 
Mayorga was created on 26 November 1971 by Decreto Ejecutivo 2077-G. Segregated from Cañas Dulces.

Geography 
Mayorga has an area of  km² and an elevation of  metres.

Demographics 

For the 2011 census, Mayorga had a population of  inhabitants.

Villages
Administrative center of the district is García Flamenco, other villages ar Argentina and Buenavista.

Transportation

Road transportation 
The district is covered by the following road routes:
 National Route 1
 National Route 917

References 

Districts of Guanacaste Province
Populated places in Guanacaste Province